The Zoological Museum of Moscow University is the second largest zoological museum in Russia (the largest is the Zoological Museum in St.Petersburg) and one of the twelve largest in the world.

The museum was established in 1791 as a museum of natural history. The present building was erected in 1898–1902. A Biological Faculty of Moscow University was established in 1930 and the museum became a part of the university for a year, became independent again and then returned to the university the end of the 1930s. In 1991 it became a research institution.

External links
Official Site

References

Natural history museums in Russia
Museums established in 1791
Museums in Moscow
Moscow State University
University museums in Russia
1791 establishments in the Russian Empire
Cultural heritage monuments in Moscow